Le-u may refer to several villages in Burma:

Le-u (24°38"N 95°5"E) -Banmauk Township
Le-u (24°28"N 95°30"E) -Banmauk Township